Adelina Rustemovna Zagidullina (born 13 January 1993) is a Russian right-handed foil fencer of Tatar origin, two-time team European champion, two-time team world champion, and 2021 team Olympic champion.

Medal Record

Olympic Games

World Championship

European Championship

Grand Prix

World Cup

References

External links

 
  (archive)
 Adelina Zagidullina at the Russian Fencing Federation  (in English) (archive)
 
 

1993 births
Living people
Russian female foil fencers
Volga Tatars
Tatar sportspeople
Tatar people of Russia
Sportspeople from Ufa
European Games gold medalists for Russia
European Games bronze medalists for Russia
European Games medalists in fencing
Fencers at the 2015 European Games
Olympic fencers of Russia
Fencers at the 2020 Summer Olympics
Medalists at the 2020 Summer Olympics
Olympic gold medalists for the Russian Olympic Committee athletes
Olympic medalists in fencing
21st-century Russian women